Francis Bellamy (31 December 1909 – 19 June 1969) was a New Zealand cricketer. He played first-class cricket for Canterbury and Otago between 1931 and 1946.

Bellamy was born at Spreydon near Christchurch in 1909. He worked as a publican and died at Invercargill in 1969. Following his death an obituary was published in the New Zealand Cricket Annual.

References

External links
 

1909 births
1969 deaths
New Zealand cricketers
Canterbury cricketers
Otago cricketers
Cricketers from Christchurch
South Island cricketers